The chopped cheese, also known as the chop cheese, is a type of sandwich originating from New York City. Found in bodegas throughout Upper Manhattan, Brooklyn, the Bronx, and Queens it is made on a grill with ground beef, onions, and mixed in melted cheese and served with lettuce, tomatoes, and condiments on a hero roll. It is compared with the cheesesteak, cheeseburger, and a cheese sloppy joe, often thought of as a mixture of all three.

Origin
Though the chopped cheese sandwich gained significant media attention around 2018, the actual origins of the sandwich are up for debate. Some have argued that it is a century-old recipe that has been "Columbused", while some think it is a more recent creation.

In popular culture
The chopped cheese has also made its way into hip hop culture, being featured in or the subject of many songs. Harlem rapper Cam'ron filmed his music video "Child of the Ghetto" at Hajji's Deli, which is largely considered the origin of chopped cheeses in NYC.

The sandwich has also been the topic of a documentary from website First We Feast. The documentary Hometown Hero: The Legend of New York's Chopped Cheese discusses the origins of the sandwich and its cultural history. In the documentary, the sandwich is referred to as being legendary, and "Harlem's favorite".

See also
 List of American sandwiches
 List of sandwiches

References

External links
First We Feast documentary

American sandwiches
Cheese sandwiches
Cuisine of New York City
Beef sandwiches